Germany at the European Athletics Team Championships participated at all editions of the European Athletics Team Championships from Leiria 2009.

Final standings
Germany participated in the Super League in all editions and was three-time winner.

Results

Overall

See also
 German Athletics Association
 Germany at the World Athletics Championships
 Germany at the European Athletics Championships

References

External links
 European Athletic Association

Athletics in Germany
Nations at the European Athletics Team Championships
European Athletics Team